= Asus VivoTab Note 8 =

Tablet computer

The Asus VivoTab Note 8 is a tablet computer by Asus.
